Mazraat Assaf (also spelled Mazraat Aassaf) (Arabic: مزرعة عساف) is a village in the Bsharri District of Lebanon. The village is located near the towns of Qnat and Mazraat Bani Saab. The Greek Orthdox Annunciation of the Theotokos Church is celebrated in the town. In 2009, there were 336 voters in the town, and there were 329 voters in the year 2014 with 165 females and 164 males.

References 

Populated places in the North Governorate
Bsharri District